Reginald Jahon Newhouse (born February 16, 1981) is a former American football wide receiver who played in the National Football League (NFL). He was signed by the Arizona Cardinals as an undrafted free agent in 2003 after playing college football at Baylor.

His father Robert was a running back in the NFL for the Dallas Cowboys.

References

External links
Baylor Bears bio 

1981 births
Living people
American football wide receivers
Baylor Bears football players
Arizona Cardinals players
Players of American football from Dallas